Graeme James Hogg (born 17 June 1964) is a Scottish former footballer.

He began his career with Manchester United in 1984 and went on to play 83 league games for the club before joining Portsmouth in 1988. During his time at Old Trafford, United were FA Cup winners in 1985, but Hogg was not part of the squad that beat Everton 1–0 at Wembley.

When he played for Heart of Midlothian, his nose was broken when team captain Craig Levein punched him after an on-field dispute during a pre-season friendly match.

He also played for West Bromwich Albion, Notts County (where he won the Anglo-Italian Cup) and Brentford.

Hogg finished his career with Linlithgow Rose between 1998-1999.

Hogg made four appearances for the Scotland under-21s team between 1984 and 1985.

References

External links

Profile at Stretford End.co.uk

1964 births
Living people
Scottish footballers
Scottish Football League players
English Football League players
Manchester United F.C. players
West Bromwich Albion F.C. players
Portsmouth F.C. players
Heart of Midlothian F.C. players
Notts County F.C. players
Brentford F.C. players
Linlithgow Rose F.C. players
Association football central defenders
Footballers from Aberdeen
Scotland under-21 international footballers